K2-315 is a star in the southern zodiac constellation Libra. It has an apparent magnitude of 17.67, requiring a powerful telescope to be seen.

K2-315 has a stellar classification of M3.5 V, indicating that it is a M-type main-sequence star (with 14% uncertainty). It has 17.4% the mass of the Sun and 20% its radius. Typical for red dwarves, it has a luminosity less than 1% of the Sun, which yields an effective temperature of 3,300 K. Unlike most planetary hosts, K2-315 is metal-deficient, with an iron abundance only 57% that of the Sun.

Planetary system 
In 2020, an exoplanet was discovered orbiting the star via  transit.

See also
 K2-315b, an exoplanet rotating around K2-315.

References 

Planetary systems with one confirmed planet
M-type main-sequence stars
Libra (constellation)